Archpriest Isidor Barndt (1816–1891), a poet and world traveler from Neisse, Germany, a town in the former  state of Silesia, now Nysa, Poland, promoted reunionism and wrote about similarities in faiths in order to overcome splits between Protestants and Catholics in late 19th-century Germany.

References

Lutheran and Catholic Reunionists in the Age of Bismarck / von Manfred Fleischer / American Society of Church History/ Church History, Vol. 57, Supplement: Centennial Issue (1988), pp. 89-107

Pius-Hymnen : Sonette / von Isidor Barndt. - Schweidnitz : Kaiser, 1871

Von Hindostan nach Preußen : photographische Reisebilder in Versen ; mit Anmerkungen / von Isidor Barndt. - Neisse : Hinze, 1868

Blätter und Blumen : Gedichte / von Isidor Barndt. - Neisse : Hinze, 1867

1816 births
1891 deaths